Rar Gwamar Airport  is an airport in Dobo, Aru Islands, Indonesia. The airport is principal point of entry to the Aru Islands. The distance from Dobo city center is about 5 km. It is planned that the current 1,400 meter runway is planned to be extended to 1,800 meters according to the master plan. The runway extension is done gradually, starting from 1,500 meters which is planned to be finished by 2018.

Airlines and destinations

References

Airports in Maluku